Kamaʻehuakanaloa Seamount (previously known as Lōʻihi) is an active submarine volcano about  off the southeast coast of the island of Hawaii. This seamount is on the flank of Mauna Loa, the largest shield volcano on Earth. Unlike most active volcanoes in the Pacific Ocean that make up the active plate margins on the Pacific Ring of Fire, Kamaʻehuakanaloa and the other volcanoes of the Hawaiian–Emperor seamount chain are hotspot volcanoes and formed well away from the nearest plate boundary. Volcanoes in the Hawaiian Islands arise from the Hawaii hotspot, and as the youngest volcano in the chain, Kamaʻehuakanaloa is the only Hawaiian volcano in the deep submarine preshield stage of development.

Kamaʻehuakanaloa began forming around 400,000 years ago and is expected to begin emerging above sea level about 10,000–100,000 years from now. A diverse microbial community resides around Kamaʻehuakanaloa many hydrothermal vents.

In the summer of 1996, a swarm of 4,070 earthquakes was recorded at Kamaʻehuakanaloa. At the time this was the most energetic earthquake swarm in Hawaii recorded history. The swarm altered  of the seamount's summit; one section, Pele's Vents, collapsed entirely upon itself and formed the renamed Pele's Pit. The volcano has remained relatively active since the 1996 swarm and is monitored by  the United States Geological Survey (USGS). The Hawaii Undersea Geological Observatory (HUGO) provided real-time data on Kamaʻehuakanaloa between 1997 and 1998. Kamaʻehuakanaloa's last known eruption was in 1996, before the earthquake swarm of that summer.

Naming
The name Kamaʻehuakanaloa is a Hawaiian language word for "glowing child of Kanaloa", the god of the ocean. This name was found in two Hawaiian mele from the 19th and early twentieth centuries based on research at the Bishop Museum and was assigned by the Hawaiian Board on Geographical Names in 2021 and adopted by the U.S. Geological Survey. From 1955 to 2021 seamount was called "Lōʻihi", the Hawaiian word for "long", describing its shape. The change to Kamaʻehuakanaloa was made in an effort to be more culturally appropriate given native Hawaiian traditions for naming.

Characteristics

Geology

Kamaʻehuakanaloa is a seamount, or underwater volcano, on the flank of Mauna Loa, the Earth's largest shield volcano. It is the newest volcano created by the Hawaiʻi hotspot in the extensive Hawaiian–Emperor seamount chain.

The summit's pit craters are named West Pit, East Pit, and Pele's Pit. Pele's Pit is the youngest of this group and is located at the southern part of the summit. The thick crater walls of Pele's Pit – averaging  in width, unusually thick for Hawaiian volcanic craters – suggest its craters have filled with lava multiple times in the past.

Kamaʻehuakanaloa's north–south trending rift zones create a distinctive elongated shape, from which the volcano's earlier Hawaiian name "Lōʻihi," meaning "long", derives. The north rift zone consists of a longer western portion and a shorter eastern rift zone. Observations show that both the north and south rift zones lack sediment cover, indicating recent activity. A bulge in the western part of the north rift zone contains three  cone-shaped prominences.

Until 1970, Kamaʻehuakanaloa was thought to be an inactive volcano that had been transported to its current location by sea-floor spreading. The seafloor under Hawaii is  years old and was created at the East Pacific Rise, an oceanic spreading center where new sea floor forms from magma that erupts from the mantle. New oceanic crust moves away from the spreading center. When scientists investigated a series of earthquakes off Hawaii in 1970, they discovered that Kamaʻehuakanaloa was an active member of the Hawaiian–Emperor seamount chain.

Kamaʻehuakanaloa is built on the seafloor with a slope of about five degrees. Kamaʻehuakanaloa is following the pattern of development that is characteristic of all Hawaiian volcanoes. Geochemical evidence from Kamaʻehuakanaloa's lavas indicates that Kamaʻehuakanaloa is in transition between the preshield and shield volcano stage, providing valuable clues to the early development of Hawaiian volcanoes. In the preshield stage, Hawaiian volcanoes have steeper sides and a lower level of activity, producing an alkali basalt lava. Continued volcanism is expected to eventually create an island at Kamaʻehuakanaloa. Kamaʻehuakanaloa experiences frequent landslides; the growth of the volcano has destabilized its slopes, and extensive areas of debris inhabit the steep southeastern face. Similar deposits from other Hawaiian volcanoes indicate that landslide debris is an important product of the early development of Hawaiian volcanoes. Kamaʻehuakanaloa is predicted to rise above the surface in 10,000 to 100,000 years.

Age and growth

Radiometric dating was used to determine the age of rock samples from Kamaʻehuakanaloa. The Hawaii Center for Volcanology tested samples recovered by various expeditions, notably the 1978 expedition, which provided 17 dredge samples. Most of the samples were found to be of recent origin; the oldest dated rock is around 300,000 years old. Following the 1996 event, some young breccia was also collected. Based on the samples, scientists estimate Kamaʻehuakanaloa is about 400,000 years old. If the data model from other volcanoes such as Kīlauea holds true for Kamaʻehuakanaloa, 40% of the volcano's mass formed within the last 100,000 years. Assuming a linear growth rate, Kamaʻehuakanaloa is 250,000 years old. However, as with all hotspot volcanoes, Kamaʻehuakanaloa's level of activity has increased with time; therefore, it would take at least 400,000 years for such a volcano to reach Kamaʻehuakanaloa's mass.

Activity
Kamaʻehuakanaloa is a young and fairly active volcano, although less active than nearby Kīlauea. In the past few decades, several earthquake swarms have been attributed to Kamaʻehuakanaloa, the largest of which are summarized in the table below. The volcano's activity is now known to predate scientific record keeping of its activity, which commenced in 1959. Most earthquake swarms at Kamaʻehuakanaloa have lasted less than two days; the two exceptions are the 1990-1991 earthquake, lasting several months, and the 1996 event, which was shorter but much more pronounced. This is evidence that Kamaʻehuakanaloa's seismicity is volcanic in origin.

The low-level seismic activity documented on Kamaʻehuakanaloa since 1959  has shown that between two and ten earthquakes per month are traceable to the summit. Earthquake swarm data have been used to analyze how well Kamaʻehuakanaloa's rocks propagate seismic waves and to investigate the relationship between earthquakes and eruptions. This low level activity is periodically punctuated by large swarms of earthquakes, each swarm composed of up to hundreds of earthquakes. The majority of the earthquakes are not distributed close to the summit, though they follow a north–south trend. Rather, most of the earthquakes occur in the southwest portion of Kamaʻehuakanaloa. The largest recorded swarms took place on Kamaʻehuakanaloa in 1971, 1972, 1975, 1991–92 and 1996. Seismic events that have a magnitude under 2 are recorded often, but their location cannot be determined as precisely as it can for larger events. In fact, HUGO (Hawaii Undersea Geological Observatory), positioned on Kamaʻehuakanaloa's flank, detected ten times as many earthquakes as were recorded by the Hawaiian Volcano Observatory (HVO) seismic network.

1996 earthquake swarm

The largest amount of activity recorded for the Kamaʻehuakanaloa seamount was a swarm of 4,070 earthquakes between July 16 and August 9, 1996. This series of earthquakes was the largest recorded for any Hawaiian volcano to date in both amount and intensity. Most of the earthquakes had moment magnitudes of less than 3.0. "Several hundred" had a magnitude greater than 3.0, including more than 40 greater than 4.0 and a 5.0 tremor.

The final two weeks of the earthquake swarm were observed by a rapid response cruise launched in August 1996. The National Science Foundation funded an expedition by University of Hawaiʻi scientists, led by Frederick Duennebier, that began investigating the swarm and its origin in August 1996. The scientists' assessment laid the groundwork for many of the expeditions that followed. Follow-up expeditions to Kamaʻehuakanaloa took place, including a series of manned-submersible dives in August and September.
These were supplemented by a great deal of shore-based research. Fresh rock collected during the expedition revealed that an eruption occurred before the earthquake swarm.

Submersible dives in August were followed by NOAA-funded research in September and October 1996. These more detailed studies showed the southern portion of Kamaʻehuakanaloa's summit had collapsed, a result of a swarm of earthquakes and the rapid withdrawal of magma from the volcano. The event involved the movement of  cubic meters of volcanic material. "Pele's Vents", an area on the southern side, previously considered stable, collapsed completely into a giant pit, renamed "Pele's Pit". Strong currents make submersible diving hazardous in the region.

The researchers were continually met by clouds of sulfide and sulfate. The sudden collapse of Pele's Vents caused a large discharge of hydrothermal material. The presence of certain indicator minerals in the mixture suggested temperatures exceeded , a record for an underwater volcano. The composition of the materials was similar to that of black smokers, the hydrothermal vent plumes located along mid-ocean ridges. Samples from mounds built by discharges from the hydrothermal plumes resembled white smokers.

The studies demonstrated that the most volcanically and hydrothermally active area was along the southern rift. Dives on the less active northern rim indicated that the terrain was more stable there, and high lava columns were still standing upright.

Recent activity
Kamaʻehuakanaloa has remained largely quiet since the 1996 event; no activity was recorded from 2002 to 2004. The seamount showed signs of life again in 2005 by generating an earthquake bigger than any previously recorded there. USGS-ANSS (Advanced National Seismic System) reported two earthquakes, magnitudes 5.1 and 5.4, on May 13 and July 17. Another earthquake measuring 4.7 was later recorded approximately midway between Kamaʻehuakanaloa and Pāhala (on the south coast of the island of Hawaii).

Exploration

Early work

Kamaʻehuakanaloa Seamount's first depiction on a map was on Survey Chart 4115, a bathymetric rendering of part of Hawaiʻi compiled by the US Coast and Geodetic Survey in 1940. At the time, the seamount was non-notable, being one of many in the region. A large earthquake swarm first brought attention to it in 1952. That same year, geologist Gordon A. Macdonald hypothesized that the seamount was actually an active submarine shield volcano, similar to the two active Hawaiian volcanoes, Mauna Loa and Kīlauea. Macdonald's hypothesis placed the seamount as the newest volcano in the Hawaiian–Emperor seamount chain, created by the Hawaiʻi hotspot. However, because the earthquakes were oriented east–west (the direction of the volcanic fault) and there was no volcanic tremor in seismometers distant from the seamount, Macdonald attributed the earthquake to faulting rather than a volcanic eruption.

Geologists suspected the seamount could be an active undersea volcano, but without evidence the idea remained speculative. The volcano was largely ignored after the 1952 event, and was often mislabeled as an "older volcanic feature" in subsequent charts. Geologist Kenneth O. Emery is credited with naming the seamount in 1955, describing the long and narrow shape of the volcano as Kamaʻehuakanaloa. In 1978, an expedition studied intense, repeated seismic activity known as earthquake swarms in and around the Kamaʻehuakanaloa area. Rather than finding an old, extinct seamount, data collected revealed Kamaʻehuakanaloa to be a young, possibly active volcano. Observations showed the volcano to be encrusted with young and old lava flows. Fluids erupting from active hydrothermal vents were also found.

In 1978, a US Geological Survey research ship collected dredge samples and photographed Kamaʻehuakanaloa's summit with the goal of studying whether Kamaʻehuakanaloa is active. Analysis of the photos and testing of pillow lava rock samples appeared to show that the material was "fresh", yielding more evidence that Kamaʻehuakanaloa is still active. An expedition from October 1980 to January 1981 collected further dredge samples and photographs, providing additional confirmation. Studies indicated that the eruptions came from the southern part of the rift crater. This area is closest to the Hawaiʻi hotspot, which supplies Kamaʻehuakanaloa with magma. Following a 1986 seismic event, a network of five ocean bottom observatories (OBOs) were deployed on Kamaʻehuakanaloa for a month. Kamaʻehuakanaloa's frequent seismicity makes it an ideal candidate for seismic study through OBOs. In 1987, the submersible DSV Alvin was used to survey Kamaʻehuakanaloa
Another autonomous observatory was positioned on Kamaʻehuakanaloa in 1991 to track earthquake swarms.

1996 to present
The bulk of information about Kamaʻehuakanaloa comes from dives made in response to the 1996 eruption. In a dive conducted almost immediately after seismic activity was reported, visibility was greatly reduced by high concentrations of displaced minerals and large floating mats of bacteria in the water. The bacteria that feed on the dissolved nutrients had already begun colonizing the new hydrothermal vents at Pele's Pit (formed from the collapse of the old ones), and may be indicators of the kinds of material ejected from the newly formed vents. They were carefully sampled for further analysis in a laboratory. An OBO briefly sat on the summit before a more permanent probe could be installed.

Repeated multibeam bathymetric mapping was used to measure the changes in the summit following the 1996 collapse. Hydrothermal plume surveys confirmed changes in the energy, and dissolved minerals emanating from Kamaʻehuakanaloa. Hawaiʻi Undersea Research Laboratory, HURL's  submersible Pisces V allowed scientists to sample the vent waters, microorganisms and hydrothermal mineral deposits.

Since 2006, the Fe-Oxidizing Microbial Observatory (FeMO), funded by the National Science Foundation and Microbial Observatory Program, has led cruises to Kamaʻehuakanaloa investigate its microbiology every October. The first cruise, on the ship R/V Melville and exploiting the submersible JASON2, lasted from September 22 to October 9. These cruises study the large number of Fe-oxidizing bacteria that have colonized Kamaʻehuakanaloa. Kamaʻehuakanaloa's extensive vent system is characterized by a high concentration of CO2 and iron, while being low in sulfide. These characteristics make a perfect environment for iron-oxidizing bacteria, called FeOB, to thrive in.

HUGO (Hawaii Undersea Geological Observatory)
In 1997, scientists from the University of Hawaiʻi installed an ocean bottom observatory on the summit of Kamaʻehuakanaloa Seamount. The submarine observatory was nicknamed HUGO, (Hawaiʻi Undersea Geological Observatory). It was designed to give scientists real-time seismic, chemical and visual data about the state of Kamaʻehuakanaloa, which had by then become an international laboratory for the study of undersea volcanism. The cable that provided HUGO with power and communications broke in April 1998, effectively shutting it down. The observatory was recovered from the seafloor in 2002.

Ecology

Hydrothermal vent geochemistry

Kamaʻehuakanaloa's mid-Pacific location and its well-sustained hydrothermal system contribute to a rich oasis for a microbial ecosystem. Areas of extensive hydrothermal venting are found on Kamaʻehuakanaloa's crater floor and north slope, and along the summit of Kamaʻehuakanaloa itself. Active hydrothermal vents were first discovered at Kamaʻehuakanaloa in the late 1980s. These vents are remarkably similar to those found at the mid-ocean ridges, with similar composition and thermal differences. The two most prominent vent fields are at the summit: Pele's Pit (formally Pele's Vents) and Kapo's Vents. They are named after the Hawaiian deity Pele and her sister Kapo.

Microorganisms
Low oxygen and pH levels are important factors in supporting the high amounts of Fe (iron), one of the hallmark features of Kamaʻehuakanaloa. These characteristics make a perfect environment for iron-oxidizing bacteria, called FeOB, to thrive in. An example of these species is Mariprofundus ferrooxydans, sole member of the class Zetaproteobacteria. The composition of the materials was similar to that of black smokers, that are a habitat of archaea extremophiles. Dissolution and oxidation of the mineral observed over the next two years suggests the sulfate is not easily preserved.

A diverse community of microbial mats surround the vents and virtually cover Pele's Pit.
The Hawaiʻi Undersea Research Laboratory (HURL), NOAA's Research Center for Hawaiʻi and the Western Pacific, monitors and researches the hydrothermal systems and studies the local community.
The National Science Foundation (NSF) funded an extremophile sampling expedition to Kamaʻehuakanaloa in 1999. Microbial mats surrounded the  vents, and included a novel jelly-like organism. Samples were collected for study at NSF's Marine Bioproducts Engineering Center (MarBEC). In 2001, Pisces V collected samples of the organisms and brought them to the surface for study.

NOAA's National Undersea Research Center and NSF's Marine Bioproducts Engineering Center are cooperating to sample and research the local bacteria and archaea extremophiles. The fourth FeMO (Fe-Oxidizing Microbial Observatory) cruise occurred during October 2009.

Macroorganisms
Marine life inhabiting the waters around Kamaʻehuakanaloa is not as diverse as life at other, less active seamounts. Fish found living near Kamaʻehuakanaloa include the Celebes monkfish (Sladenia remiger), and members of the Cutthroat eel family, Synaphobranchidae. Invertebrates identified in the area include two species endemic to the hydrothermal vents, a bresiliid shrimp (Opaepele loihi) of the family Alvinocarididae (described in 1995), and a tube or pogonophoran worm. Dives conducted after the 1996 earthquake swarms were unable to find either the shrimp or the worm, and it is not known if there are lasting effects on these species.

A small number of species identified at Kamaʻehuakanaloa were newly recorded sightings in Hawaiʻi, including the Tassled coffinfish (Chaunax fimbriatus), and the Celebes monkfish.

See also

List of volcanoes in the Hawaiian–Emperor seamount chain

References

Further reading

Scripps Institution of Oceanography. (2002). Benthic Invertebrate Collection Database.

External links

Hawaii Center for Volcanology, University of Hawaiʻi.
Kamaʻehuakanaloa SeamountUSGS website.
Loihi Submarine Volcano: A unique, natural extremophile laboratoryNOAA research site.
HURL Current Research – Loihi after the July–August event, on the 1996 Lōʻihi Seamount Exploration
Recent volcanic activity at Loihi – University of Hawaiʻi
Fe-Oxidizing Microbial Observatory Project (FeMO) Webpage – Earthref.org

Submarine volcanoes
Active volcanoes
Hawaiian–Emperor seamount chain
Seamounts of the Pacific Ocean
Volcanoes of Hawaii
Hotspot volcanoes
Polygenetic volcanoes
Holocene volcanoes
Cenozoic Hawaii
Quaternary Oceania